The University of the South, familiarly known as Sewanee, is a private Episcopal liberal arts college in Sewanee, Tennessee. It is owned by 28 southern dioceses of the Episcopal Church, and its School of Theology is an official seminary of the church. The university's School of Letters offers graduate degrees in American Literature and Creative Writing.

History

Beginning in  the 1830s Bishop James Otey of Tennessee led an effort to found an Episcopal seminary in the Deep South.  Following the Mexican War the Episcopal Church saw tremendous growth in the region, and a real need for an institution "to train natives, for natives" as Otey put it arose.  Up to that point only the Virginia Theological Seminary in Alexandria, Virginia existed south of the Mason-Dixon Line and other denominations were already establishing schools in the region.  The location was chosen primarily because of the proximity to the major railway hub of Chattanooga, Tennessee and the existing railroad spur up the mountain, the "Mountain Goat" which ran from 1858 until April 1985.  Bishop Leonidas Polk commented that due to the access to railroads one could reach any point in the South from Sewanee within thirty-six to forty-eight hours.  

On July 4, 1857, delegates from ten Southern dioceses of the Episcopal Church in the United States—Alabama, Arkansas, Florida, Georgia, Louisiana, Mississippi, North Carolina, South Carolina, Tennessee, and Texas—were led up Monteagle Mountain by Polk for the founding of their denominational college for the region. The goal was to create a Southern university free of Northern influences. As Otey put it: the new university will "materially aid the South to resist and repel a fanatical domination which seeks to rule over us." The majority of the land for the university was donated by the Sewanee Mining Company on the condition that a university "be put in operation within ten years".  The company's early profits were derived from the labor of mainly African-American convict leasing.

The six-ton marble cornerstone, laid on October 10, 1860, and consecrated by Polk, was blown up in 1863 by Union soldiers; many of the pieces were collected and kept as keepsakes by the soldiers. A few were donated back to the university, and a large fragment was eventually installed in a wall of All Saints' Chapel. Several figures later prominent in the Confederacy, notably Polk, Bishop Stephen Elliott, Jr., and Bishop James Hervey Otey, were significant founders of the university. Generals Edmund Kirby Smith, Josiah Gorgas and Francis A. Shoup were prominent in the university's postbellum revival and continuance.

Because of the damage and disruptions during the Civil War, construction came to a temporary halt. Polk died in action during the Atlanta campaign. He is remembered through his portrait Sword Over the Gown, painted by Eliphalet F. Andrews in 1900. After the original was vandalized in 1998, a copy by Connie Erickson was unveiled on June 1, 2003.

In 1866, building was resumed, and this date is sometimes used as the re-founding of the university and the year from which it has maintained continuous operations (though official materials and anniversary celebrations still use 1857). The university's first convocation was held on September 18, 1868, with nine students and four faculty members present. Presiding was the Rt. Rev. Charles Todd Quintard, vice-chancellor (chief academic officer) of the university, second Bishop of Tennessee and "Chaplain of the Confederacy" (compiler of the Confederate Soldiers' Pocket Manual of Devotions, 1863). He attended the first Lambeth Conference in England (1868) and received financial support from clergy and laity of the Church of England for rebuilding the school. Quintard is known as the "Re-Founder" of the University of the South.

During World War II, the University of the South was one of 131 tertiary institutions nationally that took part in the V-12 Navy College Training Program, which offered students a path to a Navy commission.

Schools of dentistry, engineering, law, medicine, and nursing once existed, and a secondary school was part of the institution into the second half of the 20th century. However, for financial reasons it was eventually decided to focus on the college and the School of Theology. In June 2006, Sewanee opened its School of Letters, a second graduate school. The School of Letters offers a Master of Arts in American Literature and a Master of Fine Arts in Creative Writing.

2004 name change
For the period 2004 to about 2016, the institution combined its two historical names in all university publications that were not official documents and styled itself as "Sewanee: The University of the South". Version three of the university's style guide, a document reflecting the official policies of the university with respect to its public image following the name change, stated in part:

When this naming system was proposed in 2004, it was misinterpreted by some alumni to reflect a change in the official name of the university. A minor scandal ensued, with more conservative commentators insinuating that the change was intended to "distance" the university from its historic association with Southern culture. "Some alumni were also angered by a report commissioned by the university last year [2004] by a marketing firm from Chicago that said that the word 'South' often had negative connotations for students around the country; the weaker the connection between the South and the university's name, the better, the consultants said."

As of February 2016, the university has reverted to using the University of the South as its official name on all correspondence. Version six of the university's style guide now instructs university employees to “use 'the University of the South' on first reference," though it may be accompanied by the modifying, "familiarly known as Sewanee."

2018 Charlie Rose controversy
In the wake of several women coming forward with allegations of sexual harassment against television personality Charlie Rose, many educational institutions revoked honorary degrees bestowed on him. Sewanee's board of regents initially declined to do so, citing a desire to "not condemn the individual". However, due to particular backlash originating from student members of the board of trustees and faculty in the university's school of theology, the board of regents reversed their original decision and rescinded Rose's honorary doctorate.

Ties to slavery and the Roberson Project
In September 2020, the board released a statement acknowledging for the first time that the university "was long entangled with, and played a role in, slavery, racial segregation, and white supremacy". It added that the university "categorically rejects its past veneration of the Confederacy and of the 'Lost Cause' and wholeheartedly commits itself to an urgent process of institutional reckoning ...". The university announced that it will utilize the findings of its Roberson Project on Slavery, Race, and Reconciliation (which began in 2017) to guide their current discussions and path forward.

Academics
Sewanee offers bachelors, masters and PhD degrees. Its most popular undergraduate majors, by 2021 graduates, were:
Economics (52)
Psychology (50)
Political Science & Government (42)
Biology/Biological Sciences (36)
English Language & Literature (36)
History (28)
International/Globalization Studies (24)

Campus

The Sewanee campus overlooks the Tennessee Valley and consists of 13,000 acres on the Cumberland Plateau. It includes many buildings constructed of various materials faced with local stone, most done in the Gothic style. In September 2011, it was named by Travel + Leisure as one of the most beautiful college campuses in the United States.

 All Saints' Chapel was originally designed by Ralph Adams Cram and began construction in 1904 (replacing the smaller, wooden St. Augustine's Chapel which stood nearby), but the Panic of 1907 left the university without the funds to complete it. It was completed in 1959 to a design by Vice-Chancellor Edward McCrady. McCrady was also responsible for the connection of the buildings of the original quadrangle with cloisters. During his tenure as vice-chancellor, the Jessie Ball duPont Library was constructed. McCrady was determined to fill the plain windows of All Saints' Chapel with stained glass, though many remained without for several years. After his death, a new stained glass window, which includes his image, was dedicated in his memory. The final window was installed in 2004, nearly 100 years after construction began on the chapel.
 St. Luke's Chapel, designed by the architect Charles C. Haight and built in 1904, is one of three chapels on the campus (All Saints, Chapel of The Apostles, St. Luke's). St. Luke's is located next to St. Luke's Hall (1887) which formerly housed the School of Theology.  The Chapel itself is used in various capacities over the academic year, including hosting services in the Taizé style of worship.
The Fowler Center is located on Texas Avenue and is the recreation center for the university.  It houses swimming pools, basketball courts, tennis courts, a running track, and weight rooms and group exercise rooms.  Many of the trophies from Sewanee's athletic history are also located in this building.
Bishop's Commons is located near the Jessie Ball duPont Library and serves as the student union building.  The Sewanee Outing Program is housed there along with The Student Post office, commonly referred to as "The SPO".  The Tiger Bay Pub is also located in this building.
The duPont Library first opened in 1965. It hosts around 750,000 printed volumes. Special features of the duPont Library include: the Theology Library, the William Ralston Listening Library & Archive (containing a state of the art listening space and over 15,000 compact discs), and the Cup and Gown Café'.
 The Chapel of the Apostles was designed by the Arkansas architectural firm of E. Fay Jones and Maurice J. Jennings for the School of Theology and was dedicated and consecrated in October 2000.  Primarily used as the worship center for the School of Theology, the chapel hosts services Monday through Friday during sessions.  The Daily Office is prayed daily along with celebrations of the Eucharist.

McClurg Dining Hall is located adjacent to All Saints' Chapel and is the main dining hall on campus.
Sewanee has 19 traditional dormitories, each housing a mix of students from all class years. Theme housing, consisting of small living units focused on a common interest such as a foreign language, is also available. Ninety-nine percent of Sewanee students live in campus housing.
The School of Theology is located on Tennessee Avenue near Gorgas and Quintard residence halls and houses the School of Theology, its faculty, its classrooms, and the Beecken Center, and administrative offices for the Education for Ministry program. Prior to 1981, the building housed the Sewanee (Military) Academy, now part of St. Andrew's-Sewanee School nearby.
 Spencer Hall houses the chemistry, biology, and biochemistry departments, as well as components of environmental science. Its completion in late August 2008 provided an additional  to the existing Woods Lab science building. Sustainable building practices and technology were incorporated into Spencer Hall.
 Snowden Hall houses the Department of Forestry and Geology and components of environmental science. A new  addition and remodeling of the building was completed in 2010, making this the university's first LEED Gold–certified building.  of solar panels provide about a third of the building's electricity needs, and a bioswale filters runoff from the roof top.

Literary associations
The Sewanee Review, founded in 1892, is the oldest continuously published literary magazine in the United States, and has published many distinguished authors.  Its success has helped launch the Sewanee Writers' Conference, held each summer. The School of Letters, offering an M.A. in English and M.F.A. in Creative Writing, was established in 2006. The current editor is Adam Ross (author).

Sewanee and its environs have been the (temporary or full-time) residence of authors such as Allen Tate, Andrew Lytle, William Alexander Percy, Walker Percy, Shelby Foote, Caroline Gordon, and Robert Lowell. In 1983 playwright and Pulitzer Prize winner Tennessee Williams left his literary rights to the University of the South. Royalties have helped build the Tennessee Williams Center, a performance venue and teaching facility, and to create the Tennessee Williams teaching fellowships, which bring well-known figures in the arts to the campus.

"",  the university's motto, is taken from the opening of Psalm 133:  "Behold how good and how pleasant it is for brethren to dwell together in unity."

Environmental sustainability
Since Fall 2008, the university has held an annual Sustainability Week, which featured speakers, feasts of local foods, and environmentally themed documentaries. The campus is also home to an environmental sustainability house, The Green House, and residence halls have environmental sustainability representatives.  In 2007, the university became a signatory to the President's Climate Commitment. As of 2011, the university received a "B" on the College Sustainability Report Card.

Institutional traditions

The school is rich in distinctive traditions, many of which are tied to Southern culture. For example, male students have historically worn coats and ties to classes—this tradition has generally been continued, though the coat and tie are often combined with casual pants and sometimes shorts.  However, this tradition is currently in decline. Faculty and student members of the primary honor society and main branch of student government, the Order of Gown (changed after controversy surrounding the exclusivity of the title "order of the gownsmen"), may wear academic gowns to teach or attend class—one of the last vestiges of this historically English practice in North America. Furthermore, the Order is charged with the maintenance of this and other traditions of the university.  Similarly, both genders enjoy drinking societies and secret societies  and the ribbon societies continue to thrive. At major events, members of the former two groups display their distinctive ceremonial garb, kilts and capes. There are the Red Ribbon and Green Ribbon Societies for men (including membership in the faculty) and the Pink Ribbon and White Ribbon for women. While most drinking societies will accept sophomores, the Ribbons are for juniors and seniors. In addition to the more established societies, there are numerous drinking societies and secret societies that exist in the college. The vice-chancellor on formal occasions assumes the cappa clausa (cope) as the vice-chancellor at Cambridge University still does.

The university's honor code is one of the most cherished traditions since the university's inception. The honor code states that "I will not lie, cheat, or steal" along with a number of amended premises such as a toleration clause for academic offenses (it is a violation of the honor code to not report cheating), and other specifics meant to guide the student body. Each new student entering the university must sign the honor code at a formal service in All Saints Chapel. The honor code and system is administered by a student-run, student-elected honor council. Only the vice-chancellor may overturn a decision through an appeals process. Although the honor council was once governed by the Order of Gown, the honor council is now an independent body whose procedures and rules are their sole governance. The associate dean of the college is the faculty adviser to the council as well as the university's general counsel.

In the early 2000s, some alumni and students expressed a concern that the school was trying to downplay the university's traditions, particularly its historical and cultural ties with Southern culture. As a result, some traditions came under special scrutiny.

Greek life
The university saw the installation of its first fraternity in 1877 with the founding of the Tennessee Omega chapter of Alpha Tau Omega. In 1880, that chapter became the first of any fraternity in the South to have its own chapter house or lodge, which belonged to the fraternity until its closure in 2021. As of 2022, slightly over half of Sewanee male students are members of fraternities, and slightly over two-thirds of female students belong to sororities.

Mace controversy
The university mace, an unsolicited gift dedicated to early Ku Klux Klan leader Nathan Bedford Forrest, which prominently featured a Confederate battle flag, has been a point of interest in the debate over the university's identity, because of its association with Forrest and its implications for attitudes toward African Americans. Forrest had no connection with the university; the mace had been commissioned in 1964 by Louise Claiborne-Armstrong, whose brother attended the university. (A portrait of her by Amanda Brewster Sewell is in the University Art Gallery.)

It was given to the university in 1965 and was carried by the president of the Order of Gownsmen at academic processions until it disappeared in 1997. Upon its rediscovery, various alumni offered to pay for the mace's repair but the university declined their offer.

Festival of Lessons and Carols
Each year around the second week of Advent on the church calendar, the university choir, along with other members of the Sewanee community, holds the Festival of Lessons and Carols at All Saints' Chapel. Based on a service originally offered at Truro Cathedral in England in 1880, the service combines readings about the Christmas story from prophecy of a messiah to the fulfillment of the prophecy in the gospel texts.  The service is also punctuated with traditional Anglican hymns and music. Sewanee has been holding this event for over 50 years.

Athletics

Sewanee was a charter member of the Southern Intercollegiate Athletic Association in 1894.  The Sewanee Tigers were pioneers in American intercollegiate athletics and possessed the Deep South's preeminent football program in the 1890s. The 1899 football team had perhaps the best season in college football history, winning all 12 of their games, 11 by shutout, and outscoring their opponents 322–10. Five of those wins, all shutouts, came in a six-day period while on a  trip by train. In 2012, the College Football Hall of Fame held a vote of the greatest historic teams of all time, where the 1899 Iron Men beat the 1961 Alabama Crimson Tide as the greatest team of all time.

Sewanee was also a charter member of the Southeastern Conference upon its formation in 1932. By this time, however, its athletic program had declined precipitously and Sewanee never won a conference football game in the eight years it was an SEC member. The Tigers were shut out 26 times in their 37 SEC games, and were outscored by a combined total of 1163–84.

When Vice Chancellor Benjamin Ficklin Finney, who had reportedly objected to Sewanee joining the SEC, left his position in 1938, the leading candidate was Alexander Guerry, a former president of the University of Chattanooga. According to a university historian, Guerry agreed to come to Sewanee only if the school stopped awarding athletic scholarships. In 1940, two years after Guerry's arrival, Sewanee withdrew from the SEC and subsequently deemphasized varsity athletics. Guerry's stance is sometimes credited as an early step toward the 1973 creation of NCAA Division III, which prohibits athletic scholarships.

Sewanee went on to become a charter member of the College Athletic Conference in 1962. The conference, now the Southern Collegiate Athletic Conference (SCAC), consists of small, academically focused private liberal arts colleges such as Sewanee.

Sewanee is now a member of the Southern Athletic Association (SAA), offering 11 varsity sports for men and 13 for women. As is the case for all of its previous conferences, Sewanee is a charter member of its current conference—it was one of the seven SCAC members that announced their departure from that conference at the 2011 annual meeting of SCAC presidents. The seven were joined by Berry College, another small private school in Georgia.

Notable alumni and faculty

Sewanee has over 12,000 alumni from all 50 states and 40 countries and has produced 26 Rhodes Scholars, as well as 34 NCAA Postgraduate Fellows, 46 Watson Fellowships, and dozens of Fulbright Scholars. The School of Theology's alumni include bishops, including three of the last five presiding bishops of the Episcopal Church.

See also
Cordell-Lorenz Observatory
Sewanee Perimeter Trail

References

External links

 
 Sewanee Athletics website

 
Sewanee, Tennessee
Anglican seminaries and theological colleges
Liberal arts colleges in Tennessee
Private universities and colleges in Tennessee
Schools in Franklin County, Tennessee
Seminaries and theological colleges in Tennessee
Universities and colleges affiliated with the Episcopal Church (United States)
Episcopal Church in Tennessee
Leonidas Polk
Universities and colleges accredited by the Southern Association of Colleges and Schools
Buildings and structures in Franklin County, Tennessee
Education in Franklin County, Tennessee
Educational institutions established in 1857
1857 establishments in Tennessee
Lost Cause of the Confederacy